The 1971 Virginia Slims of Oklahoma City was a women's tennis tournament played on indoor carpet courts at the Frederickson Field House Arena in Oklahoma City, Oklahoma in the United States that was part of the 1971 WT Pro Tour. It was the inaugural edition of the tournament and was held from January 29 through February 1, 1971. First-seeded Billie Jean King won the singles title and earned $2,500 first-prize money.

Finals

Singles
 Billie Jean King defeated  Rosie Casals 1–6, 7–6, 6–4

Doubles
 Rosie Casals /  Billie Jean King defeated  Mary-Ann Eisel /  Valerie Ziegenfuss 6–7, 6–0, 7–5

Prize money

References

Virginia Slims of Oklahoma City
Virginia Slims of Oklahoma City
1971 in sports in Oklahoma